Oxbow Lake, located in Saint Paul, Virginia, offers the Saint Paul community a recreational area with walking and biking paths, a fishing area, and a picnic area.

External links
St. Paul Virginia - Recreation (via WayBack Machine)

Reservoirs in Virginia
Bodies of water of Russell County, Virginia
Bodies of water of Wise County, Virginia